Krauss is a German surname. Notable people with the surname include:

 Alison Krauss (born 1971), American bluegrass musician
 Alexander Krauß (born 1975), German politician
 Alexis Krauss (born 1985), musician of the noise pop duo Sleigh Bells
 Anna Krauss (born 1884) German clairvoyant 
 Beatrice Krauss (1903–1998), American botanist 
 Clemens Krauss (1893–1954), Austrian conductor
 Charles A. W. Krauss (1851–1939), American politician
 Christian Ferdinand Friedrich Krauss (1812–1890), known as Ferdinand Krauss, German scientist, traveller and collector
 Friedrich Salomon Krauss (1859–1938), Austrian ethnographer
 Gabrielle Krauss (1842–1906), Austrian-born French operatic soprano
 Georg Krauß, (1826–1906), German industrialist and the founder of the Krauss Locomotive Works
 Krauss-Maffei, German engineering company, named in part after Georg Krauß
 Hermann August Krauss (1848–1937), Austrian entomologist
 Johan Carl Krauss (1759–1826), German physician and botanist
 Lawrence M. Krauss (born 1954), American physicist and writer
 Michael E. Krauss (1934–2019), American linguist
 Michael I. Krauss (born 1951), American law professor
 Nicole Krauss (born 1974), American novelist
 Rosalind E. Krauss (born 1941), American art critic
 Ruth Krauss (1901–1993), American poet, playwright and children's book author
 Samuel Krauss (1866–1948), Hungarian philologist and historian
 Thomas F Krauss, British physicist working in the field of photonic crystals
 Werner Krauss (1884–1959), German actor
 Werner Krauss (academic) (1900–1976), German professor of Romance studies

See also 
 
 Kraus
Krause
Krauze
Krausz

German-language surnames

Surnames from nicknames